Minabad may refer to:
 Minabad, Ardabil
 Minabad, Hamadan
 Minabad, Kurdistan
 Minabad, South Khorasan
 Minabad Rural District, in Ardabil Province